Queen of the Mountain is a 2005 documentary film about Theresa Goell, a middle-aged woman who, in 1947, left her husband and son to dig beneath the sanctuary of Nemrud Dagh. Goell was fascinated by this shrine to King Antiochus I Theos of Commagene, which had been neglected by previous archaeologists.

Queen of the Mountain tells her story through archival footage, family photographs, oral histories, commentary from Goell's friends and her own letters. The New York Times said it offered a "strong, rich narrative with visuals to match."

Reception
The New York Times wrote,

Notes

See also
Jews of Iran
Pola's March
Marion's Triumph
My Yiddish Momme McCoy

References

External links
 Queen of the Mountain Women Make Movies

2005 films
Documentary films about historical events
Documentary films about Jews and Judaism
Documentary films about women
American documentary films
2005 documentary films
2000s English-language films
2000s American films